Terenty Ivanovich Chemodurov (1849 – 1919), was a Russian servant.  He was the personal butler of Tsar Nicholas II of Russia. 

He served the former Imperial family during their exile in Siberia during the Russian revolution. Shortly before the execution of the Romanov family, he fell ill and was interred in a prison hospital, where he was forgotten by the Reds (thus escaping execution together with the Romanovs) and then freed by the Whites. He is known as a witness of the imprisonment of the former imperial family.

References

1849 births
1919 deaths
Court of Nicholas II of Russia
People of the Russian Revolution